Banjax was a folk and ceilidh-dance band based in Hastings on the south coast of England, mainly active during the 1990s. The name is a play on words, referencing the fact that its members were initially drawn from the members of the local Mad Jacks Morris dancers.

The band initially coalesced more or less organically around the iconic figure of Dave Roberts, a melodeon player who for some years had been a member of the folk super-group Blowzabella before he moved to Hastings to take up a job teaching at the local college. The initial line-up of Banjax was as follows (in alphabetical order); Peter Bolwell (saxophone and recorder), Brian Chainey (drums), Gilly Henry (later to be known as Gilly Linn – violin and recorder), Dennis Langley (concertina), Keith Leech (trombone), Cliff Mason (bass guitar), Pete Moore (trombone and vocals), Neil Parker (recorder and lead guitar), Lynda Ridley (recorder), Dave Rimell (rhythm guitar), and Dave Roberts (melodeon and whistle).

Banjax was basically a ceilidh-dance band, and ceilidhs require a "caller" to direct the dances and guide people through the movements before and during the performance. Unlike many such bands however Banjax did not need to work with external callers, since both Dave Roberts and Keith Leech were well able to do this themselves.

History
Banjax was always a big band with a big sound. From the start, however, they were resolved not simply to play the melody of the tune over and over as long as the dance required, as so many folk dance bands were prone to do, but to make the music interesting enough so that even those who were not dancing would find it worth listening to. The arrangements of the music were always therefore an important and characteristic feature of the band's sound.

In 1989 having honed their sound playing for dances in the Hastings area, Banjax made their first recording: a mini-album of six tracks that was only released as a cassette tape, called “Marbles on the Dance Floor” (this being a slight adaptation of a line from a William Butler Yeats poem) and featured a guest appearance on keyboards by Cliff Mason's wife Marion.

Inevitably, the band being the size that it was, there were some changes in personnel as time went on. Cliff Mason withdrew soon after "Marbles" appeared (and, sadly, was to die from cancer in 1995). His place on the bass guitar was filled by Neil Cartwright, whose background was more in rock music than folk, and who added a distinctive drive and power to the sound. In addition Ian Miller, a multi-instrumentalist, played with the band for a short time before his job took him away to Surrey. Dennis Langley also left shortly afterwards to start his own folk-dance band.

By this time, Banjax had begun to attract wider attention. In April 1989 they had already appeared at a "folk music" day at Butlin's holiday camp in Bognor Regis as the support act for Whippersnapper, the band formed by folk-fiddle superstar Dave Swarbrick following his departure from Fairport Convention. The following year however things really began to take off. In April 1990 they were booked by Rod Stradling to play for the prestigious monthly "Dance House" ceilidh at Cricklade, in Wiltshire. Then in August they performed at the massive Sidmouth Folk Week festival, followed shortly afterwards by a trip abroad to play in Dordrecht, which was Hastings "twin town" in the Netherlands. Back home, in September they played for one of the high-profile Newick ceilidhs organised by local musician and impresario Mel Stevens. A further booking followed for the Chippenham folk festival in May 1991, and in May 1992 they played for a ceilidh on the pier at the Jack-in-the-Green festival on their home turf at Hastings, one of the biggest events in the Hastings annual calendar, with Gordon Potts from The Committee Band doing a superb job as guest caller for the evening.

In 1993 Banjax played at Towersey Village Festival, probably the second most prestigious in England after Sidmouth. By this time another local folk-musician Dave Levett had joined the band playing melodeon, and when Neil Cartwright withdrew from the band Dave Levett replaced him on the bass guitar.

Albums
In the early 1990s Banjax travelled with their own sound engineer, Dave Lock (another dancer from Mad Jacks Morris) and as a sign of their increasing self-confidence they felt the time was right to make a proper full-length album, which was released in 1992 on Compact Disc and cassette under the name "Chaos in One" (this time a quotation from Friedrich Nietzsche!) The album, produced by Neil Cartwright, received favourable reviews at home and abroad, in the premier British folk magazine "Folk Roots" and also in "Dirty Linen" published in Maryland, USA and "In Folk Us" in South Australia. Radio Two's Jim Lloyd ("Folk on Two"), writing in "Folk Roots", chose it amongst his Top Ten releases of 1992, and it was even said that the album was being played to passengers flying on Virgin Airlines flights between Britain and the USA!

This album shows just how far Banjax had come in the three years since "Marbles on the Dance Floor". There are now only a few of the familiar dance-tunes which are every ceilidh band's stock in trade. Many of the numbers on this album are indeed familiar tunes, but hardly in this context. On the track called "Wenlock Safari" for example a dance tune from the Welsh border country gets grafted onto the South African township sound of "Tom Hark" and also Bert Kaempfert's classic "Swinging Safari". The folk-standard "Jenny Lind" transforms into the calypso of "Yellow Bird". The music of the renaissance puts in an appearance with "Pass et Medio" from Tielman Susato's 16th century collection, which is introduced on recorders playing in four-part harmony, only for a ska beat to appear from the bass and suddenly the musical landscape is transformed. Another marked difference from the "Marbles" album is that the band now began to sing as well as playing dance tunes. Keith Leech gives a swaggering rendition of "Ratcliffe Highway", Pete Moore sings the defiant miners' anthem "Blackleg Miner" and Gilly Linn does the sea-shanty "Roll the Woodpile Down" while the band plays a reggae accompaniment behind her. Moreover, in a complete break with everything else, there is a novelty rock-and-roll number "Dance With Me" written by Neil Cartwright and featuring Gilly's daughter, Josie on vocals.

Decline
Tragedy struck in April 1994 when Gilly Linn, who had a heart condition, suffered a severe stroke and died within a few days at the age of 43. Diane Moody, an accomplished fiddler from The Committee Band, stepped in to help, but it was not an entirely satisfactory arrangement as she lived in London and was in any case committed to play with The Committee Band as her first priority. Nevertheless, Banjax continued to play and to tour, especially in the west country where they seemed to be much more in demand than on their home patch. It was after one such gig that tragedy struck again. Following a dance in Gloucester on 24 February 1996 Dave Roberts, who like Gilly also suffered from a heart condition, was taken ill and although he appeared to have recovered by the time he was dropped off at home in the early hours, he died that afternoon at the age of 48.

The death of Dave Roberts so soon after losing Gilly was a body blow. Keith Leech was able to take over as the main caller, Neil Cartwright rejoined the band to play bass once more releasing Dave Levett to play melodeon, and the band kept going. In August they not only played Sidmouth Folk Festival again but had the honour of being the closing act for the "late night extra". Returning to Hastings they were immediately "on show" again to do an open-air performance in the High Street for the Old Town festival, and in May they played at the prestigious Black Horse festival at Telham. However everyone was aware the band was struggling to maintain its sense of purpose. In the Spring of 1997 first Dave Rimell and then in turn Neil Cartwright and Dave Levett resigned from the band, and it was clear that the writing was on the wall. Geoff Marchant was invited to join the band to play rhythm guitar and Rob McCabe to play bass, and as 1999 started Banjax were still playing and touring. However the spirit and the heart had gone from it, and before the end of the year they agreed to call it a day.

Present days
British Synth-pop band Gravity Noir reworked the track "The Thrifty Wife & the Kite" from the Banjax album 'Chaos In One'(1992) into a remix version. A special Christmas edition was released end of November 2019. The original track was written by Keith Leech back in 1992. Keith Leech and Patrick Knight (Lead singer and producer, Gravity Noir) are cousins. The remixed track also features on Gravity Noir's new album 'Future Days" (Release 18 March 2020).

Music videos

References

External links
http://www.folkmusic.net/htmfiles/webrevs/grmncd01.htm
http://www.webfeet.org/eceilidh/bands/banjax.html

British folk music groups